Quinn Paynter (born 19 August 1961) is a Bermudian boxer. He competed in the men's light middleweight event at the 1988 Summer Olympics.

References

External links
 

1961 births
Living people
Bermudian male boxers
Olympic boxers of Bermuda
Boxers at the 1988 Summer Olympics
Place of birth missing (living people)
Light-middleweight boxers